The Becoming is an EP released by American rock band, After Midnight Project.  It was released in 2007.

This album caught the attention of Universal Motown and eventually led to the band being signed by them.  The tracks, "Take Me Home," "The Real Thing," and "The Becoming" are being released on the band's upcoming full-length, Let's Build Something to Break, with "Take Me Home" being the first single off the album. "Take Me Home" has reached number 28 on the U.S. Alternative Songs chart. The album itself has never charted.

Track listing

Personnel
 Jason Evigan-vocals, programming, guitar
 Spencer Bastian-guitar
 Dan Morris-drums
 TJ Armstrong-bass, vocals
 Christian Meadows-guitar

References

2007 EPs
After Midnight Project albums
Self-released EPs